Thomas Hunting (born April 10, 1965) is an American musician. He is the drummer and only remaining original member of the thrash metal band Exodus.

Career 
Hunting is the only original member of Exodus left, although he departed from the band on two occasions. He first left the band due to an illness in 1989 and was replaced by John Tempesta, but returned in 1997 with Paul Baloff, Gary Holt, Rick Hunolt, and new bassist Jack Gibson for the Another Lesson in Violence tour. Hunting (along with Steve "Zetro" Souza, and Rick Hunolt) once again left Exodus in 2005, and was replaced with drummer Paul Bostaph, who had left Slayer when Dave Lombardo rejoined the band. Later, in 2007, Hunting rejoined the band when Bostaph left to rejoin Testament. He has said that he is great friends with Bostaph.

Hunting has played on played on eight out of eleven of Exodus' studio albums: Bonded by Blood (1985), Pleasures of the Flesh (1987), Fabulous Disaster (1989), Tempo of the Damned (2004), The Atrocity Exhibition... Exhibit A (2007), Exhibit B: The Human Condition (2010), Blood In, Blood Out (2014) and Persona Non Grata (2021). He also appeared on the 2008 album Let There Be Blood, which is a re-recording of the entire Bonded by Blood album.

Hunting has cited Creedence Clearwater Revival, John Bonham of Led Zeppelin, Keith Moon of The Who, Neil Peart of Rush, Michael Derosier of Heart, and Clive Burr of Iron Maiden as his main influences.

Health 
In February 2021, Hunting was diagnosed with squamous cell carcinoma (SCC) of the stomach. On April 13, three days after his 56th birthday, he revealed his diagnosis. A week later, Exodus launched a GoFundMe campaign, which passed the $80,000 mark in less than a week, with Metallica guitarist and former bandmate Kirk Hammett donating $5,000, and Fozzy vocalist and professional wrestler Chris Jericho donating among others. On May 20, Steve "Zetro" Souza said that Hunting was fairing well in his cancer treatment.

Hunting underwent a successful total gastrectomy on July 12, less than five months after starting the treatment process. He said that he had four rounds of chemotherapy and that the cancer shrunk to less than half the size it was in March, and would have four more treatments before resuming his activities. On July 26, Gary Holt declared Hunting cancer free; however, Hunting clarified that despite being told that everything was removed from his stomach, he said that it was "presumptuous" to say cancer free before being scheduled for four more outro chemo treatments and a scan to show that he no longer lives with cancer. Holt acknowledged his previous statement by saying that he may have in his excitement "jumped the gun", but expressed optimism towards Hunting's progress in his recovery.

References 

Living people
American heavy metal drummers
Exodus (American band) members
1965 births
20th-century American drummers
American male drummers
20th-century American male musicians
Angel Witch members